The Knee Knackering North Shore Trail Run, also known as the Knee Knacker, was established in 1989 and is a 50 km ultramarathon trail run in that takes place in British Columbia, in the Greater Vancouver area on the second Saturday of July each year.   Due to a municipality's environmental concerns, the field is limited to 200 runners. Because of the race's popularity, the entrants are selected by lottery. The route, comprising about 2,600 m of vertical climb and descent, generally follows the Baden-Powell Trail, and traverses the North Shore Mountains from Horseshoe Bay to Deep Cove.

Course

Both ends of the Baden Powell trail course are close to sea level, with a high point of 4,016 feet (1224 m) at the peak of Black Mountain.  The  course follows a scenic and very technical trail through a coastal British Columbia rain forest.  Most of the trail is within the forest, and there are some spectacular vistas at a number of points along the way, particularly at Eagle Bluff. In addition to the challenging terrain, the race is well known for its high volunteer-to-runner support ratio and the full banquet held afterward, where all runners receive an award certificate for completing the race.

Records

The course record was set by Nick Elson in 2017, he led from start to finish and completed the course in 4:32.03. This surpassed the record set by Aaron Heidt in 2010, who posted a mark of 4:39.52. The women's record holder is Ellie Greenwood, who clocked 5:06.09 in 2010.

References

External links
 Kneeknacker.com  Knee Knackering North Shore Trail Run (official Web site)

Recurring sporting events established in 1989
Ultramarathons
Sports competitions in British Columbia